Nobbys Tuff is a geologic formation in eastern Australia. Found in Newcastle within the Lachlan Orogen, this stratum is up to 25 metres thick. Formed from volcanic ash in an eruption in the Wuchiapingian age, in the late Permian around 255.02 Ma. This formation includes tuff, tuffaceous sandstone, tuffaceous siltstone, claystone, and chert. Often noticed at Nobbys Head in Newcastle.

See also 
 Newcastle Coal Measures
 Lachlan Orogen

References 

Geologic formations of Australia
Permian System of Australia
Wuchiapingian
Geology of New South Wales
Formations